Alyssa Brown (born 11 May 1989) is a Canadian artistic gymnast.

Brown competed at the 2006 Commonwealth Games where she won a silver medal in the vault event and a bronze medal in the team event.

She also won two bronze medals at the 2005 Pan American Gymnastics Championships in the team and balance beam events.

References

1989 births
Living people
Sportspeople from Oakville, Ontario
Canadian female artistic gymnasts
Commonwealth Games medallists in gymnastics
Commonwealth Games silver medallists for Canada
Gymnasts at the 2006 Commonwealth Games
20th-century Canadian women
21st-century Canadian women
Medallists at the 2006 Commonwealth Games